In broadcasting, local origination may refer to:

community radio
community television
local insertion
local programming
public-access television

Broadcasting